This is a list of public art in Green Park, one of the Royal Parks of London.

Green Park lies between Hyde Park and St James's Park, in the City of Westminster. Much of the present landscaping is the result of remodelling by John Nash in the 1820s, and the park had been cleared of its buildings, dating to the time of Queen Caroline, by 1855. Governments have traditionally been reluctant to situate memorials in the Royal Parks, and there were none in Green Park until the installation of the Canada Memorial in 1994. Since then two further war memorials have been added, with the second (dedicated to the memory of RAF Bomber Command) drawing criticism for "the un-greening of this section of Green Park".

References

Bibliography

 

 

 

Green Park